The Sparkasse Mittelholstein AG, based in Rendsburg, is one of five free public savings banks existing in Germany.

Organization structure
The Sparkasse Mittelholstein is a savings bank in Schleswig-Holstein. Since 1991 it has been a Joint-stock company registered in the German Trade Register of Kiel. The legal basis for the Sparkasse is essentially the Kreditwesengesetz (KWG) and the Savings Banks Act for Schleswig-Holstein. The bodies of the Sparkasse are the Annual General Meeting, the Supervisory Board and the Management Board.

The share capital of the Sparkasse Mittelholstein AG is held by the following shareholders:

 Haspa Finanzholding – 51,45 %
 Zweckverband der Sparkasse Hennstedt-Wesselburen - 20,28 %
 Stiftung Spar- und Leih-Kasse in Rendsburg – 13,37 %
 Private shareholders and employees – 6,77 %
 Stadt Büdelsdorf – 5,14 %
 Zweckverband Sparkasse Mittelholstein – 1,69 %
 Stadt Rendsburg – 1,30 %

As of: 30 June 2018

History
The Sparkasse Mittelholstein was created in 1823 under the name Spar- und Leih-Kasse in Rendsburg as a foundation savings bank. The foundation's capital was 1,500 Mark courant. Founder was Johann Georg Röhling. In 1847 was the founding of another predecessor institute, the Spar- und Leihcasse in Nortorf. In 1979 it merged with the Verbandssparkasse Nortorf to Sparkasse Nortorf. In 1862, the Hademarscher Spar- und Leihcasse - Verein, the third predecessor institute was created. It was converted in 1899 into a public limited company and thus forms the origin of the present form of the company. In 1973, the Hademarscher Spar- und Leihcasse AG merged with the Kirchspiel Spar- und Leihkasse zu Hanerau to Sparkasse Hanerau-Hademarschen AG. This was the first savings bank as a joint-stock company in the Federal Republic of Germany.

The current institute was founded in 1991. In 2007, the takeover of the public legally Sparkasse Büdelsdorf took place. The city Büdelsdorf, as a sponsor of the former Sparkasse Büdelsdorf, received in return shares of the Sparkasse Mittelholstein AG and has since participated in their share capital.

On 1 July 2017, retroactively to 1 January 2017, the Sparkasse Mittelholstein merged with Sparkasse Hennstedt-Wesselburen.

Business focus
The Sparkasse Mittelholstein AG operates the universal banking business as a savings bank in its business area. It works together with the following partners in the network business:

 DekaBank (Germany)
 Deutsche Leasing AG
 Hamburger Sparkasse AG
 HSH Nordbank AG
 LBS Bausparkasse Schleswig-Holstein-Hamburg AG
 MSH – Mittelstandsfonds Schleswig-Holstein
 Norddeutsche Landesbank
 PLUSCARD a service company for credit card processing mbH Mastercard and VisaCard
 Provinzial NordWest
 S-Broker
 Sparkassen-Finanzgruppe
 UKV, a company of the Versicherungskammer Bayern (VKB)

Financial figures
In the 2017 financial year, the Sparkasse Mittelholstein had total assets of € 2.682 billion and had customer deposits of € 1.661 billion. According to the savings bank ranking 2017, it is ranked 142nd in terms of total assets. It has 26 branches/self-service locations and 480 employees.

References

External links
 Official Website

Banks of Germany
Corporate finance
1991 establishments in Germany